Festucalex kulbickii, commonly known as Kulbicki's pipefish, or New Caledonian pipefish, is a species of marine fish of the family Syngnathidae. It is found from West Papua, Indonesia and Papua New Guinea to New Caledonia. It is expected to feed on small crustaceans, similar to other pipefish. This species is ovoviviparous, with males brooding eggs and giving birth to live young. The specific name honours Dr. Michel Kulbicki  of L’Institut de recherche pour le développement (IRD) in Nouméa, New Caledonia.

References

Further reading
WoRMS

kulbickii
Marine fish
Fish described in 2004